Hazel Grove (Midland) railway station was a railway station in Hazel Grove, Cheshire, England, which was in use between 1 July 1902 and 1 January 1917.

Construction and location

The Midland Railway (MR) opened the station on its  'Disley cut off' line (correct name: the New Mills and Heaton Mersey Line). This line was completed in 1902, to improve access of the MRs fast trains from London St Pancras via Derby to Manchester Central. The station was located 800 yards (730 m) south of Hazel Grove's centre, at the point where the line crossed over the Macclesfield and Buxton roads by means of two over-bridges, that are still in use. There was a siding on the Up line towards New Mills for goods trains to recess into by reversing in off the main line. There was also a pair of sidings adjacent to the Down line and the station. These two sidings were also accessed by reversing back into them at the Cheadle Heath end. Nothing remains of the station platform or subway and only the footpath leading up from Buxton Road remains with original slatted wooden Midland Railway style fencing and gates, however some of this has now been lost due to a nearby car wash development. Hazel Grove (Midland) signalbox was located at the New Mills end of the station and lasted until closure in March 1977 when removed thereafter.

Train service

The station was underused. Very few trains stopped there as it was inconveniently located, so it was closed after only 15 years of use.

See also
Hazel Grove railway station

References
Notes

Bibliography

External links
Hazel Grove (Midland) Station on navigable 1948 O.S. map
Information from Subterranea Britannica

Disused railway stations in the Metropolitan Borough of Stockport
Former Midland Railway stations
Railway stations in Great Britain opened in 1902
Railway stations in Great Britain closed in 1917